James Peter Allen (born 1945) is an American Egyptologist, specializing in language and religion. He was curator of Egyptian Art at the Metropolitan Museum of Art from 1990 to 2006. In 2007, he became the Charles Edwin Wilbour Professor of Egyptology at Brown University. In 2008, he was elected president of the International Association of Egyptologists. A graduate of Saint Meinrad Seminary and School of Theology, he received his PhD from the University of Chicago.

Major publications
 The Inflection of the Verb in the Pyramid Texts (Malibu: Undena, 1984)
 Genesis in Egypt: The Philosophy of Ancient Egyptian Creation Accounts (New Haven: Yale University Press, 1988)
 Middle Egyptian: An Introduction to the Language and Culture of Hieroglyphs (Cambridge: University Press, 2000)
 The Heqanakht papyri. (New York: Metropolitan Museum of Art, 2002)
 The Art of Medicine in Ancient Egypt (New York: Metropolitan Museum of Art, 2006)
 The Ancient Egyptian Pyramid Texts (Society of Biblical Literature, 2005)
 The Egyptian Coffin Texts, Vol. 8. Middle Kingdom Copies of Pyramid Texts (Chicago: University Press, 2006)
 "The Amarna Succession" in Causing His Name to Live: Studies in Egyptian Epigraphy and History in Memory of William J. Murnane, University of Memphis, 2007
 Middle Egyptian: An Introduction to the Language and Culture of Hieroglyphs 2nd ed. (Cambridge: University Press, 2010)
 The Debate between a Man and His Soul, a Masterpiece of Ancient Egyptian Literature (Culture and History of the Ancient Near East 44; Leiden and Boston: Brill, 2011)
 The Ancient Egyptian Language: An Historical Study (Cambridge University Press, 2013)
 Middle Egyptian Literature: Eight Literary Works (Cambridge University Press, 2015)
 A Grammar of the Ancient Egyptian Pyramid Texts, Vol. I: Unis (Eisenbrauns, 2017) 
 Ancient Egyptian Phonology (Cambridge University Press, 2020)
 Coptic: A Grammar of Its Six Major Dialects (Eisenbrauns, 2020)
 "Ancient Egyptian Thought" (to be published by the American University in Cairo Press).

References

Sources
 

1945 births
Living people
American Egyptologists
People associated with the Metropolitan Museum of Art
Brown University faculty